Roboman may refer to:

 Roboman, an episode of the animated TV series Super Inggo at ang Super Tropa
 The Vindicator (film), known in Brazil as Roboman
 Robomen, fictional characters in the Doctor Who serial The Dalek Invasion of Earth, and its theatrical adaptation Daleks – Invasion Earth: 2150 A.D.

See also 

 
 
 
 
 Man (disambiguation)
 Robo (disambiguation)
 Robotman (disambiguation)
 Robotoman (disambiguation)
 Android (disambiguation)